Hend Sabry (born 20 November 1979) is a Tunisian Egyptian actress working in Egypt.

Career
Sabry starred as "'Ola" in the Egyptian television drama Ayza Atgawez as a character obsessed with getting married, who goes through dozens of prospective fiancés. She works continuously in the Egyptian cinema and resides in Cairo.

In 2010 she was appointed an ambassador against hunger by the UN World Food Programme. Arabian Business listed her among the "100 most powerful Arab women" in 2013.

She was on the cover of the Tunivisions people magazine in June 2011. She is also an ambassador for Garnier.

Personal life 
Sabry was engaged for over two years to Syrian actor Bassel Khaiat.

Sabry is married to Egyptian businessman Ahmad el Sherif and has dual-nationalities of her home country Tunisia and her country of residence Egypt.

Filmography

Films

Television series

References

External links

 
 
 

1979 births
20th-century Tunisian actresses
21st-century Tunisian actresses
Ambassadors of supra-national bodies
Egyptian film actresses
Egyptian television actresses
Living people
Lycée Pierre Mendès France (Tunisia) alumni
People from Kebili Governorate
Tunisian film actresses
Tunisian television actresses
World Food Programme people